Terence "Terry" Hall (20 November 1926 – 3 April 2007) was an English ventriloquist. He appeared regularly on television with his puppet, Lenny the Lion, whose catchphrase was "Aw, don't embawass me!" Hall is credited with having been one of the first ventriloquists to use a non-human puppet.

Biography
Hall was born in Chadderton, Lancashire, where his parents ran a working men's club. He was educated at St Patrick's School in Oldham and at De La Salle College in Pendleton, Salford. Hall initially worked as a ventriloquist with a boy dummy, named Mickey Finn, and won a talent show aged 15.

Hall created Lenny the Lion in 1954 after he visited the zoo while working at the summer season in Blackpool. Lenny was made from an old fox fur and papier-mâché, with a golf ball for the nose. He originally had a mouthful of fearsome teeth, but they were removed at the suggestion of singer Anne Shelton to avoid scaring children in the audience.

Hall and Lenny first appeared on BBC Television in 1956, in a variety show entitled Dress Rehearsal that also signalled Eric Sykes's television debut. The Lenny the Lion Show ran on from 1957 to 1960, followed by Lenny's Den in 1959 to 1961, and the pop music show Pops and Lenny in 1962 to 1963. In 1958 Bill Mevin created a comic strip based on Lenny the Lion. Hall visited the United States in 1958, making his debut on The Ed Sullivan Show with Lenny that year. Throughout the 1960s, Hall and Lenny appeared on stage in Blackpool and on television. The Beatles made one of their early TV appearances in a 1963 episode of Pops and Lenny, singing "From Me to You" and "Please, Please Me". David Bowie's father, Hayward Jones, worked on the show, and launched the Lenny the Lion Fan Club. Lenny advertised Trebor mints for three years. Hall released a single, "Lenny's Bath Time", in 1963.

In spite of the fact that Hall was a staunch Oldham Athletic fan, during the 1957–58 English football season, Hall took Lenny to the Den (old) which was then the home of Millwall F.C. and allowed Lenny to pose with his "fellow Lions" for publicity shots, much to the delight of all present in the ground.

Hall and Lenny continued to work in variety through the 1970s, appearing on television in programmes such as Crackerjack and 3-2-1. From 1977 to 1980, Hall regularly appeared in the educational television programme Reading With Lenny. He wrote the Kevin the Kitten series of children's reading books which accompanied the series.

Hall married twice. He had two daughters from his first marriage to Kathleen Mary Hall, who died. He married a second time in 1980, to dance teacher Denise Francis. He suffered from Alzheimer's disease in later life, and died in 2007 in Coventry aged 80. Dr Harry Brünjes, a long-standing family friend, gave the eulogy at the service.

References

External links

Lenny the Lion at TelevisionHeaven.com
Children's entertainer Hall dies, BBC News, 11 April 2007
Obituary, The Independent, 12 April 2007
Obituary , The Daily Telegraph, 12 April 2007
Obituary, The Times, 14 April 2007

1926 births
2007 deaths
British entertainers
People from Chadderton
Ventriloquists